Peter II (1304 – 8 August 1342) was the King of Sicily from 1337 until his death, although he was associated with his father as co-ruler from 1321. Peter's father was Frederick III of Sicily and his mother was Eleanor, a daughter of Charles II of Naples. His reign was marked by strife between the throne and the nobility, especially the old families of Ventimiglia, Palizzi and Chiaramonte, and by war between Sicily and Naples.

Contemporaries regarded Peter as feeble-minded. Giovanni Villani, in his Nuova Cronica, calls him "almost an imbecile" (Italianate Latin: quasi un mentacatto) and Nicola Speciale, in his Historia Sicula, calls him "pure and simple" (purus et simplex).

Under Peter, the Neapolitans conquered the Lipari Islands and took the cities of Milazzo and Termini in Sicily itself. He died after a short illness on 8 August 1342 in Calascibetta and was buried in the cathedral of Palermo. He was succeeded by Louis, his eldest son, who was only four years old.

Marriage and children
He married Elisabeth of Carinthia, with whom he had nine children:

Constance (1324 – October 1355), regent of Sicily from 1352 to 1354, unmarried
Eleanor (1325–1375), married Peter IV of Aragon, mother of Martin II of Sicily
Beatrice (1326–1365), married Rupert II, Elector Palatine, mother of Rupert of Germany.
Euphemia (1330–1359), regent from 1355 to 1357, unmarried
Louis of Sicily (1338 - 1355), succeeded his father
Frederick IV (1341 - 1377), successor of Louis
Violante (born 1334), died young
John (1342 – 22 June 1353), died young
Blanche (1342–1373), married Count John I of Empúries, but had no issue

References

Sources

|-

1304 births
1342 deaths
14th-century Kings of Sicily
House of Barcelona (Sicily)
Burials at Palermo Cathedral